The Tenth Justice (1997) is Brad Meltzer's first novel. Brad wrote the book when he was 26, a recent graduate of Columbia Law School. It centers on a Supreme Court clerk who leaks the Court's ruling to another lawyer. The lawyer is a fraud who blackmails the clerk. The lawyer and his friends come up with a plan to save themselves and stop the blackmailer. According to WorldCat, the book is in 1901 libraries

Plot
Ben Addison, a new Supreme Court clerk, accidentally reveals an upcoming decision to another lawyer. That lawyer is a fraud though and he makes millions off the announcement. The lawyer also blackmails Ben. To save himself, Ben shares his secret with Lisa, a fellow clerk, and his three roommates: a State Department worker, a Washington Daily reporter and a Senator's assistant. The team uses their resources to uncover the blackmailer and save their friend, but their abuse of power comes at a cost. Someone within their circle is leaking information, so they must battle internal and external forces to secure their once-bright futures.

See also
Supreme Court of the United States in fiction

References

External links 
 http://bradmeltzer.com/book/the-tenth-justice/

1997 novels
William Morrow and Company books
1997 debut novels
Books by Brad Meltzer